The Laval Titan was one of the names used by a junior ice hockey team in the Quebec Major Junior Hockey League (QMJHL) franchise that played in Laval, Quebec, Canada, between 1971 and 1998.

History
The Rosemont National began in the 1969–70 QMJHL season as one of the founding franchises of the QMJHL, playing in the Montreal borough of Rosemont, Quebec at the Paul Sauvé Arena. After only two seasons in Rosemont the team moved to Laval, Quebec, where they would play the next 27 years under several names. Laval National was the team's original name, but they were renamed the Laval Voisins (meaning neighbours) in 1979, and then the Titan ("Titans") in 1985.

During the 1983-1984 season, Laval won their first QMJHL championship. The team was coached by Jean Bégin, and featured Mario Lemieux who had scored 133 goals and 282 points in 70 games during the regular season. In game six of the championship, Laval defeated the Longueuil Chevaliers by a score of 17-1 to clinch the league title. Mario Lemieux led his team with a double hat trick and two assists.

For the 1994–95 QMJHL season the team was renamed Laval Titan Collège Français, when the Collège Français came aboard as a sponsor, bring some of its management when the Verdun Collège Français folded in the off-season. In 1998, faced with an aging Colisée de Laval and dwindling attendance, the team moved to Bathurst, New Brunswick.

The Titan won the President's Cup four times, in 1984, 1989, 1990 and 1993. They participated in the Memorial Cup five times and made the final once in 1994, when they hosted the tournament. They lost that year to the Kamloops Blazers.

NHL alumni
Totals include all incarnations of the Laval franchise.

Bold indicates a member of the Hockey Hall of Fame.

Season-by-season record
 Rosemont National (1969–1971)
 Laval National (1971–1979)
 Laval Voisins (1979–1985)
 Laval Titan (1985–1994)
 Laval Titan Collège Français (1994–1998)

Regular season
OL = Overtime loss, Pct = Winning percentage

References

Defunct Quebec Major Junior Hockey League teams
Sport in Laval, Quebec
Ice hockey clubs established in 1971
Sports clubs disestablished in 1998
1971 establishments in Quebec
1998 disestablishments in Quebec